The Ibom E-Library is a library located in Uyo, Akwa Ibom State, Nigeria. The library which is a state-owned is the first digital type in West Africa, Also Ibom library is one of the biggest libraries in Africa.

History 
The library was launched in Uyo state on the 25th September 2007 under the administration of Former Gov. Godswill Akpabio. It was located along  Ibrahim Babangida road in the state.

Structure 
Ibom library is an ultramodern complex with flamboyant facilities which aid education and academic research. It has capacity to occupy 1000 persons, the library was divided into private and open sections as well as board rooms and offices

Users are able to access the library after the payment of #5,000 as registration fee and #40,000 is charged for programming tutorial.

Collections 
Ibom Library contain multimedia materials resource centre for children, 1260 educational games, 1000 mathematical tools. It has over 30,000 materials that covers literature and facility for e-conferencing.

See also 
Academic libraries in Nigeria

Services 

Online Library
Event Spaces
Co-working Spaces
Outdoor Event Venues
Video Conferencing

References

External links 
Official Website

Akwa Ibom State
Public libraries in Nigeria
Buildings and structures in Uyo
2007 establishments in Nigeria
Buildings and structures completed in 2007
21st-century architecture in Nigeria